Ezzat Jadoua  is a Qatari football midfielder who played for Qatar in the 2004 Asian Cup. He also played for Al Sadd, Al Khor, Al Ahli and Al Arabi.

External links

1983 births
Qatari footballers
Living people
Al Sadd SC players
Al-Khor SC players
Al Ahli SC (Doha) players
Al-Arabi SC (Qatar) players
Muaither SC players
Mesaimeer SC players
Al-Shamal SC players
Qatar Stars League players
Qatari Second Division players
Association football midfielders
Qatar international footballers